Bhiwani Aerodrome , also called Bhiwani Air Strip, is a public civil aerodrome adjacent to Gujrani village in the Bhiwani district of the Indian state of Haryana.

History

In 1948, first airstrip was built in Haryana when Ambala Air Force Station was established.

On 31July, 2013, the Chief Minister of Haryana announced that the Government of Haryana had applied for an expansion of the civilian airports namely Hisar Airport, Karnal Airport, Bhiwani Airport, Pinjore Airport and Narnaul Airport. Approval was granted by the central government for plans of the Hisar Domestic Airport and Karnal Domestic Airport. Discussions with the central government also considered setting up an additional cargo airport in the state.

In July 2014, a Right to Information (RTI) request revealed that the Directorate General of Civil Aviation (India) (DGCA) had never received a formal proposal from the Congress Government of Haryana and there were no plans to upgrade the airport.

Flights
Currently, the airport has no scheduled commercial flight operations.  The Haryana Institute of Civil Aviation (HICA) does not offer flying training nor preparation courses.

Infrastructure 
As of 2018, airport has one hangar, a VIP lounge, day landing facilities and no night landing facility.

Future development
Captain Abhimanyu, Finance Minister of Haryana, while presenting the Government of Haryana 2018-19 budget in March 2018 announced that the funds have been allocated to extend the existing 3000 feet runway to 5000 feet and parking hangar for the spillover aircraft from IGI Delhi airport will be constructed.

As of January 2019, extension of runway is underway. The night landing facilities and hangar will also be built as airlines have approached the Haryana government to park their spillover "Non-scheduled Air Operations" (NSOP) aircraft from the congested IGI airport at Delhi to Bhiwani and Narnaul airport. Consequently, all five existing government airports in Haryana will be developed to have runway of at least 5000 feet, night landing and parking hangars.

See also 

 List of airports in India by state
 Airports Authority of India
 List of busiest airports in India
 List of Indian Air Force bases
 Divisions of Haryana
 List of highways in Haryana
 Railway in Haryana

References

Bhiwani district
Airports in Haryana
Airports established in 1948
1948 establishments in India
20th-century architecture in India